Live at Brixton is the first live album by American rock band Of Mice & Men. It was released on May 27, 2016, through Rise Records.

Track listing

Personnel
 Austin Carlile – unclean vocals
 Phil Manansala – lead guitar
 Alan Ashby – rhythm guitar
 Aaron Pauley – bass, clean vocals
 Valentino Arteaga – drums, percussion

References

2016 live albums
Of Mice & Men (band) albums
Rise Records albums